The European Information Technologies Certification (EITC) programme is an international professional ICT knowledge and skills certification standard. It is developed and governed by the EITCI Institute, a non-profit organization based in Brussels that provides certification of individuals' knowledge and skills in narrow, specialized single-subject areas of ICT such as office software, computer-aided project management, online collaboration systems, and raster graphics processing.

See also
 EITCA programme
 EITCI institute

References

External links
 EITCI Official Website
 EITCI certificate and accreditation validation page

International standards
Computer standards
Cryptography standards
Information technology qualifications
Computer security qualifications
Professional titles and certifications
EITCI certification programmes
Digital divide